The Imperatour is a concert tour by the Swedish rock band Ghost in support of their fifth studio album, Impera. Following its announcement on 20 September 2021, the tour began on 25 January 2022 at the Reno Events Center in Reno, Nevada, and is currently set to conclude at the Kia Forum in Inglewood, California on 12 September 2023.

The tour features lead singer Tobias Forge performing under the persona of "Papa Emeritus IV". Since the band's inception, Forge has performed under several incarnations of pope-like personas bearing the title of "Papa Emeritus". For the release of the band's 2018 album Prequelle, as well as their 2018–2020 concert tour A Pale Tour Named Death, Forge performed in the persona of "Cardinal Copia", a character who, at the final show of that tour, was promoted to Papa Emeritus IV. For Imperatour, as with previous tours, he is backed by a band of masked musicians known as "Nameless Ghouls".

Imperatour currently encompasses three legs: a United States leg co-headlined with the Danish band Volbeat, and featuring Twin Temple as special guests, which spanned from January to March 2022; a European leg featuring Uncle Acid & the Deadbeats and Twin Temple, from April to June; and a North American leg, with Mastodon and Spiritbox, from August to September.

Background and overview

On 30 December 2020, Ghost announced that "several big things" were being developed for 2021, indicating new live performances. In September 2021, a United States tour co-headlined with Volbeat and featuring special guests Twin Temple was announced, and would become the first leg of Imperatour, kicking off in January 2022. During the first show, at Reno, Nevada's Reno Events Center on 25 January, Ghost performed "Kaisarion", the second song from their 2022 album Impera, for the first time. Each of the subsequent Imperatour concerts have featured "Kaisarion" as the first song on Ghost's setlist. The show also marked the introduction of new steampunk-inspired costumes worn by the Nameless Ghouls. Volbeat's planned appearance on the third show of the US tour was cancelled when their drummer Jon Larsen tested positive for COVID-19. The first leg of the tour concluded in March 2022 at Anaheim, California's Honda Center.

Ghost headlined the second leg of the tour, which took place in Europe from 9 April to 18 June 2022, supported by Uncle Acid & the Deadbeats and Twin Temple. During Ghost's performance on 9 April, at Manchester's AO Arena, the songs "Spillways" and "Call Me Little Sunshine" made their live debuts. The show on 18 June took place in Clisson, France, as part of the Hellfest music festival. The Hellfest show saw the band's live debut of their song "Griftwood". The show's setlist was cut short due to Forge losing his voice, and concluded with the song "Dance Macabre" rather than the initially planned show closer, "Square Hammer"; after performing "Dance Macabre", Forge thanked the audience and stated, "My voice is completely fucked. I cannot take one other song for you."

The third leg of the tour, spanning the US and Canada, featured Mastodon and Spiritbox as the opening acts; this leg began on 26 August and concluded on 23 September. During Ghost's performance on 26 August, at San Diego's Pechanga Arena, the song "Watcher in the Sky" made its live debut. At the 2 September show at Huntsville, Alabama's Von Braun Center, during a performance of the song "Year Zero", one of the Nameless Ghouls (later identified as Justin "Jutty" Taylor) fell from atop a platform; after the concert, Taylor jokingly tweeted, "I meant to do that."

During an interview on 12 September 2022, Forge confirmed that that there will be more touring in 2023, with a European leg in the summer hinted in a video. Ghost later announced that they will be performing at both the Sweden Rock Festival on 10 June 2023 in Sölvesborg, Sweden and the Tuska Open Air in Helsinki, Finland. The band later announced a third US leg dubbed the "Re-Imperatour" on 13 February 2023, which will feature Amon Amarth as special guests. A second show at the Kia Forum in Los Angeles was announced following a video, giving fans speculation that the Papa Emeritus IV character will be "killed off" at the end of the tour.

Preceding Ghost's setlist at most stops on the tour are taped recordings of the Jan Johansson composition "Klara stjärnor" and Gregorio Allegri's setting Miserere mei, Deus. The exact setlist for Imperatour has varied, but has consistently utilized "Kaisarion" as an opening number and included songs from each of the band's albums released thus far—Opus Eponymous, Infestissumam (only one song from Infestissumam has appeared in any of the setlists, that being "Year Zero"), Meliora, Prequelle, and Impera.

The character of Papa Nihil, who was "unceremoniously 'killed off at the final show of the band's previous tour, A Pale Tour Named Death, in 2020, did not appear during any of the concerts in the first leg of Imperatour. However, at the 9 April show in Manchester, the character was wheeled out onto the stage and brought "back to life", performing a saxophone solo during the song "Miasma".

Reception

Reviewing the 14 February 2022 show at Pittsburgh's Petersen Events Center, Scott Mervis of the Pittsburgh Post-Gazette praised the band's sound as "somewhere in the zone between Metallica and Blue Öyster Cult" and their flexibility in regards to the genres of their songs, writing that they are "never shy to flash influences, to go from the '60s-scented psych-rock of 'Mary on a Cross' to the Slayer stomp of 'Cirice' to the dreamy pop-metal-prog of 'Hunter's Moon. However, he called the concert "more like a Ghost greatest-hits show" than one in support of the Impera album, concluding: "As great as it all was, Ghost fans of Pittsburgh surely have one plea for the Papa: please return with the whole Impera package."

The Guardians Chris Lord, reviewing the 9 April 2022 show at Manchester's AO Arena, gave the concert a score of five out of five stars. He wrote that, by the second song on the setlist, "Rats", the band "already has a packed arena in raptures," and that Square Hammer' inspires the most frenzied singalong of the night." Of the show's technical aspects and the band members themselves, Lord wrote: "There are confetti cannons, costume changes, flamethrowers and other forms of pyro, but the band is self-aware, preventing proceedings from ever getting too cartoonish. As one of the three guitarists relishes a solo spot on 'From the Pinnacle to the Pit' a little much for his liking, Forge playfully reprimands them with a wagging finger; this is pantomime as much as rock 'n' roll."

Merlin Alderslade of Metal Hammer, also reviewing the Manchester show, wrote that the setlist was "absolutely stacked with songs designed to shake hips", and that, "They may attract their share of haters, but facts are facts: few modern bands in heavy metal know how to put on a massive, arena-worthy show like Ghost."

Setlist
 {{hidden
| headercss = background: #ccccff; font-size: 100%; width: 100%;
| contentcss = text-align: left; font-size: 100%; width: 100%;
| header = Reno Events Center
| content =
"Imperium" (taped)
"Kaisarion"
"Rats"
"From the Pinnacle to the Pit"
"Mary on a Cross"
"Devil Church"
"Cirice"
"Hunter's Moon"
"Faith"
"Helvetesfönster" (abridged)
"Year Zero"
"Ritual"
"Mummy Dust"
"Kiss the Go-Goat"
 
Encore
"Enter Sandman" (Metallica cover)
"Dance Macabre"
"Square Hammer"
"Sorrow in the Wind" (Emmylou Harris song) (taped)
}}
 {{hidden
| headercss = background: #ccccff; font-size: 100%; width: 100%;
| contentcss = text-align: left; font-size: 100%; width: 100%;
| header = AO Arena
| content =
"Klara stjärnor" (Jan Johansson composition) (taped)
Miserere mei, Deus (Gregorio Allegri) (taped)
"Imperium" (taped)
"Kaisarion"
"Rats"
"From the Pinnacle to the Pit"
"Spillways"
"Devil Church"
"Call Me Little Sunshine"
"Miasma"
"Cirice"
"Hunter's Moon"
"Faith"
"Helvetesfönster"
"Year Zero"
"He Is"
"Ritual"
"Mummy Dust"
"Kiss the Go-Goat"

Encore
"Enter Sandman" (Metallica cover)
"Dance Macabre"
"Square Hammer"
"Sorrow in the Wind" (Emmylou Harris song) (taped)
}}
 {{hidden
| headercss = background: #ccccff; font-size: 100%; width: 100%;
| contentcss = text-align: left; font-size: 100%; width: 100%;
| header = Pechanga Arena
| content =
"Klara stjärnor" (Jan Johansson composition) (taped)
Miserere mei, Deus (Gregorio Allegri) (taped)
"Imperium" (taped)
"Kaisarion"
"Rats"
"Faith"
"Spillways"
"Devil Church"
"Cirice"
"Hunter's Moon"
"Ritual"
"Call Me Little Sunshine"
"Con Clavi Con Dio"
"Prime Mover"
"Watcher in the Sky"
"Year Zero"
"He Is"
"Miasma"
"Mary on a Cross"
"Mummy Dust"

Encore
"Dance Macabre"
"Square Hammer"
"Sorrow in the Wind" (Emmylou Harris song) (taped)
}}
Notes
 For the show in Idaho, "He Is" was performed. "Kiss the Go-Goat" was dropped from the setlist on the Oregon and Seattle shows.

Tour dates

Cancelled dates

References

Notes

Citations

Ghost (Swedish band) concert tours
2022 concert tours
2023 concert tours
Concerts at Malmö Arena
Concert tours of North America
Concert tours of the United States
Concert tours of Canada
Concert tours of Europe
Concert tours of the United Kingdom
Concert tours of France
Concert tours of Germany